Ralph Lewis "Bill" Axselle Jr. (February 27, 1943 – January 24, 2019) was an American attorney and politician who served as a member of the  Virginia House of Delegates from 1974 until 1990. After retiring from the legislature, he worked for nearly 30 years as a lobbyist for Williams Mullen.

References

External links

1943 births
2019 deaths
University of North Carolina at Chapel Hill alumni
University of Richmond School of Law alumni
20th-century American politicians
Democratic Party members of the Virginia House of Delegates